The Radisson RED Liverpool Hotel is a historic building in Liverpool, England. It is located on the east side of Lime Street, fronting Lime Street railway station. Opened in 1871 as the North Western Hotel, it more recently served as office space and student accommodation. It was restored as a hotel from 2018 to 2022. The building is recorded in the National Heritage List for England as a designated Grade II listed building.

History

Opened as a railway hotel in 1871 by the London and North Western Railway the hotel served Lime Street railway station. The design was by Alfred Waterhouse, containing 330 rooms. The hotel closed in 1933, subsequently becoming Lime Street Chambers for a while before closing once again. In 1994 the building was bought by John Moores University and, at a cost of £6 million, was converted into a hall of residence for students, opening in 1996. It was announced on 28 September 2018 that the building would be restored as a hotel by the Marcus Worthington Group at a cost of £30m, to be called the Radisson RED Liverpool Hotel.
 The hotel is set to open in December 2022.

Architecture

The building is constructed in stone with a slate roof in the Renaissance Revival style resembling a French château. The baroque details are in the Second Empire style, common for this time period. It has five storeys, a basement and an attic, and is in 21 bays. The end bays and the bays flanking the three-bay centre are carried up into towers. The central entrance is round-arched, and is flanked by Doric columns.

See also

Grade II listed buildings in Liverpool-L1

References

External links

Radisson RED Liverpool Hotel official website

Liverpool John Moores University halls of residence
Grade II listed buildings in Liverpool
Alfred Waterhouse buildings
Railway hotels in England
Grade II listed hotels
Radisson Hotels
Hotel buildings completed in 1871
Hotels established in 1871
Hotels established in 2022